The Pillage of Sigtuna was the raid of Swedish town Sigtuna by pagans from Eastern Baltic in 1187. The pillage is most commonly attributed to Estonians or Karelians.

Pillage 
According to chronicles the town of Sigtuna was burned down on 12 August 1187, and Archbishop Johannes of Uppsala was killed at Almarestäket. Killing of Jon Jarl in Asknäs has also been sometimes connected to the attack. Historians generally agree that the raid took place, but question extent of damage and identity of the attackers. Archeological record from Sigtuna provides no clear evidence of a major attack, no layer of burnt buildings or other evidence has been found.

Identity of the raiders 
The oldest sources mentioning the raid are the Annals of Visby, which describe the attackers simply as heathens.

The first source to identify the raiders are the Eric Chronicles from 1320s, which describe them as Karelians, but its reliability is not considered very high. Eric Chronicles were written at the period of Swedish conflict with Novgorod, which at the time included Karelia, so blaming the raid on them may have been a way to justify attacks in the 14th century. Karelians were not normally described as pirates in written sources, and historian Hain Rebas has questioned whether the ships they commonly used on the Lake Ladoga were even suited for sailing to Sigtuna. Additionally, there is no mention of the raid in Russian chronicles describing 1187, even though at other times they do sometimes write about Karelians who were dependent of Novgorod.

In 1540s, Olaus Petri wrote his Swedish Chronicles, making use of the Eric Chronicles but also some other sources which do not exist anymore, and he stated that Estonians burned down Sigtuna. Other 16th century historians Laurentius Petri and Johannes Magnus also attributed the attack to Estonians. Several researches regard this version more reliable, especially as Estonians definitely had ships and ability to sail to Sigtuna. For example, Livonian Chronicle of Henry mentions Estonian raid to Sweden in 1203, and states that such attacks were a common occurrence.

17th century historian Johannes Messenius mentions the raid in his Scondia illustrata, blaming it in different parts of text once on Curonians and once on Estonians. Some researchers consider Curonian participation possible, as they actively engaged in piracy, and were known to cooperate with Estonians.

Eric Chronicles 
Sweden then suffered serious harm, From the Karelians, causing great alarm. They sailed into Lake Mälar from the sea, Whether calm or stormy it might be, Secretly within the Svealand islesIn stealthily advancing files. Once their minds to the idea did turn, That they the town of Sigtuna should burn, And so thoroughly they put it to the flame, That it since then has never been the same. There Archbishop Jon was killed,  A deed that many a heathen thrilled.

References

Bibliography

1187 in Europe
Conflicts in 1187
12th century in Sweden
Looting
Battles of the Middle Ages
Battles involving Sweden